VSS-Southern Theatres, L.L.C. (aka Southern Theatres) is a movie theater chain based in New Orleans, Louisiana, United States. It was founded by George Solomon in May 2002. It operates two brands; The Grand Theatre, and AmStar Cinemas. The Grand and AmStar operate 18 multiplex stadium-seating movie theaters. In total, the chain has 18 locations (12 with luxury seating) with 266 combined screens in Alabama, Florida, Georgia, Louisiana, Mississippi, North Carolina, South Carolina and Texas, making it the sixteenth-largest theater chain in the U.S.

The company is majority owned by Veronis Suhler Stevenson (VSS), which initially made a $30 million equity investment in Southern in April 2005 and later took a majority stake. VSS is a private equity and mezzanine capital fund management company dedicated to investing in media, communications and information industries in North America and Europe. James Wood is Southern's CEO and Ron Krueger is President/COO

On September 12, 2013, VSS-Southern Theatres announced that it had acquired the movie-eatery chain Movie Tavern from Lee Roy Mitchell, who had been required to sell the company after Cinemark bought Rave Cinemas on May 29, 2013. At the time of the acquisition, Movie Taverns were found in the Dallas-Fort Worth, Houston, Atlanta, Denver, and Lexington markets. The brand has expanded to include locations in the Philadelphia, Baton Rouge, Syracuse, and Little Rock markets.

In January 2019, VSS-Southern Theatres sold Movie Tavern to Marcus Theatres.

References

External links
The Grand Theatre
AmStar Cinemas

Companies based in New Orleans
Movie theatre chains in the United States
American companies established in 2002
Entertainment companies established in 2002
2002 establishments in Louisiana